Gangbusters is a Commodore 64 game about the American Mafia that begins during the start of Prohibition in the early 1920s. A complete set of documents were included with the game that taught the players the complete glossary of the Mafia "language." The game appeared in the December 1982 issue of The Rainbow. Due to various glitches, the game failed to work on 16K machines but worked reliably on most 32K machines.

Summary

Each player tries to get promoted from punk to Godfather by purchasing a gun and attempting to murder someone. If convicted, the "state mouthpiece" will sentence the player to four years in prison. For each subsequent sentence, the sentence is doubled unless a pardon can be purchased from the "state mouthpiece". Players can purchase trucking unions, prostitutes that are all assigned with the code name Betsy, and moonshine operations. Limousines can be stolen from other players who already have them, with a certain degree of risk. Betting on horse racing events can play a role in adding valuable dollars to the player's bank account.

All games end either when the last remaining player has become the Godfather or the United States government becomes wise and defeats all the players. The game assigns each player a different American city like Brooklyn or Philadelphia from which to run his domain.

Reception
Andy Peters for The Rainbow said "If you've ever dreamed of living a life of crime, Gangbusters is an excellent way to get started, keeping you both safe and innocent!"

Roy Wagner for Computer Gaming World said "The program offers colorful book-keeping and flawless tabulation. It has very limited graphics, but is an intriguing game with more than one strategy which can win."

Reviews
Things To Do with your TRS-80 Model 100 Computer

References

1982 video games
Commodore 64 games
Commodore 64-only games
Cultural depictions of the Mafia
Organized crime video games
Simulation video games
Strategy video games
Video games developed in the United States
Video games set in the 1920s
Video games set in the United States
Works about prohibition in the United States